Nitza may refer to:

Nitza Quiñones Alejandro (born 1951), United States district judge, Pennsylvania
Nitza Ben-Dov (born 1950), Professor of Hebrew and Comparative Literature at the University of Haifa
Nitza Margarita Cintrón (born 1950), Puerto Rican scientist at NASA's Johnson Space Center
Nitza Metzger-Szmuk, Israeli architect and Emet Prize laureate in architecture
Nitza Saul (born 1950), Israeli actress on British television during the 1980s
Nitza Tufiño (born 1949), visual artist from Mexico City
Nitza Villapol (1923–1998), chef, teacher, cookbook writer, TV host in Cuba

See also
Nitzani